Life is Beautiful Music & Art Festival is an annual music, culinary, art, and learning festival held in Downtown Las Vegas, Nevada, United States. It debuted in 2013 as a three-day event. In 2019, it was one of the world's highest grossing festivals with revenues of $17.7 million.

In February 2022, Penske Media Corporation (PMC) acquired a controlling interest in the festival.  While some details of the deal were not disclosed, the purchase was made through subsidiary Rolling Stone.

History 
Founded by Rehan Choudhry in 2013, Life is Beautiful is a festival held annually in downtown Las Vegas, Nevada. WWD reported that “the festival has focused on building a brand aimed at uniting people around artistic experiences ranging from music to street artists such as Shepard Fairey, brands pooling together for experiences, small businesses and food, among other thing”.

In February 2022, a majority stake in the festival was acquired by Penske Media Corporation (PMC) via subsidiary Rolling Stone, with aims to pursue international expansion.

Art 
In addition to music, Life is Beautiful has a heavy focus on art providing its attendees with massive murals and interactive sculpture exhibits. The art features both local and international artists, as well as recycled installations from Burning Man. In 2017, art collective Meow Wolf created the fan favorite “Art Motel”  converting the abandoned motel at 225 North Seventh Street into a digital wonderland of art, custom-made sound, lighting and projections. The collective revamped 17 rooms and the space's 5,900-square-foot courtyard. While the art motel did not return in 2018, that space was transformed into a new exhibit by Portuguese artist Bordalo. The new installation focused on collecting and arranging 10,000 ft of recycled trash which was then used to create six enormous animal structures, named “Wild Wild Waste”.

The Life is Beautiful Ideas series began 2015, with the idea of spreading positivity and inspiring messages to attendees. The list of speakers has included Bill Nye,  IN-Q, Joe De Sena, Stacy London, Ru Paul, and Karamo Brown.

Comedy 
Comedy also plays a huge part in the Life is Beautiful lineup drop. Utilizing Vegas’ very own Venue Vegas, the 2018 lineup included SNL’s Pete Davidson, Michelle Wolf, and Hannibal Buress, along with Trixie Mattel from Ru Paul's Drag Race, and Jimmy O. Yang from HBO's Silicon Valley.

Location 
Life is Beautiful takes place in Downtown Las Vegas, Nevada over 18 blocks of the city. Temperatures during the festival range an average from 69º F to 94º F. Due to the urban landscaping of the surroundings, the festival rolls out 280,000 square ft of sod, providing attendees with cool spots to lay down in the shade and get out of the sun.

In the first five years of the festival, Life is Beautiful has contributed over $185 million of economic impact for the city of Las Vegas measured by a third party.
 
The September 2020 Life is Beautiful festival was cancelled due to COVID-19 concerns.

Lineups

2013 
Inaugural headliners were The Killers and Kings of Leon.
Beck, Vampire Weekend, Passion Pit, Empire of the Sun, Childish Gambino, Pretty Lights, Jurassic 5, STS9, Purity Ring, Earl Sweatshirt, Danny Brown, Portugal. the Man, Dawes, Imagine Dragons, The Joy Formidable, Charli XCX, Haim, Capital Cities, Poolside, Janelle Monáe, Alabama Shakes, Joey Bada$$, Cults, Smith Westerns, Nico Vega, Zedd, Living Colour, Youngblood Hawke, Family of the Year, Robert Delong, Cayucas, Wallpaper, Twenty One Pilots.

2014 
In 2014, the festival expanded to 3 days:

2015 
In 2015 Life is Beautiful announced a partnership with Insomniac Events to increase the presence of electronic music offerings on the line-up. Insomniac curated the Troubadour stage with headlining acts Porter Robinson, Carnage, and Knife Party.

2016 
Mumford & Sons, J. Cole, Major Lazer, G-Eazy, Empire of the Sun, The Lumineers, The Shins, Bassnectar, Flume, Tegan and Sara, Jane's Additction, Chromeo, ZHU, Leon Bridgers, Young the Giant, Galantis, Die Antwoord, Jimmy Eat World, Bloc Party, Dirty Heads, Duke Dumont, Kehlani, The Temper Trap, Third Eye Blind, KONGOS, Crystal Castles, Snakehips, City and Colour, Excision, Irration, Pete Yorn, The Naked and Famous, Alunageorge, Pete Yorn, Gramatik, Atlas Genius, Banks and Steelz, Bob Moses, Warpaint, Keys N Krates, Seven Lions, Band of Skulls, Kaytranada, Snails, Nothing But Thieves, Catfish and The Bottlemen, The Stumbellas, Jack Garratt, Kamasi Washington, Oh Wonder, Mr. Carmack, Raury, The Wombats, Bishop Briggs, The Heavy, Bomba Estereo, LANY, Highly Suspect, Jess Glynne, Autograf, Griffin, Ghastly, Mija, NF, Finish Ticket, Hey Marsielles, Rezz, Sir The Baptist, Lewis Del Mar, Coast Modern, The Shelters, CID, Durante, Spag Heddy, Anevo, Aaron Jackson, Aazar, Brittany Rose, Brumby, The Lique

2017 
Chance The Rapper, Muse, Gorillaz, Lorde, Blink-182, The xx, Kaskade, Wiz Khalifa, Pretty Lights, Cage the Elephant, Schoolboy Q, Zeds Dead, Slightly Stoopid, Pusha T, De La Soul, DREAMCAR, Matoma, Big Gigantic, Russ, Dua Lipa, Troy Boi, Kiesza, The Revivalists, J Boog, Big Wild, They., Coin, Ekali, Kali Uchis, Hayden James, Hippo Campus, Frenship, Whethan, Sigrid, SG Lewis, Middle Kids, Circa Waves, Day Wave, Ella Vos, Wingtip, Bearson, The American Weather, Cirque Du Soleil, Ideas Featuring Bill Nye, MGMT, Haim, 2 Chainz, ZHU, Milky Chance, Two Door Cinema Club, Tycho, Capital Cities, Lil Dicky, Tchami, Local Natives, Vince Staples, Sean Paul, Mura Masa, Deorro, RAC, Kyle, Broods, PVRIS, Goldroom, Sofi Tukker, Stick Figure, Tokimonsta, Mondo Cozmo, Jacob Banks, Tennyson, Shy Girls, Viceroy, San Fermin, Superpoze, Cameron, Calloway, The Rhyolite Sound

2018
The Weeknd, Arcade Fire, Florence and the Machine, Travis Scott, DJ Snake, ODESZA, N.E.R.D.m Death Cab for Cutie, Tyler the Creator, Justice, Galantis, Bastille, Miguel, St. Vincent, RL Grime, A$AP Ferg, Slyvan Esso, The Neighbourhood, Jungle, What So Not, Blackbear, Flight Facilities, Sabrina Claudio, SOFI TUKKER, 3lau, Chvrches, Foster the People, French Montana, Santigold, Cold War Kids, Daniel Caesar, Alison Wonderland, T-Pain, The Drums, Robert De Long, DVBBS, Blood Orange, Wolfmother, Cashmere Cat, Gramatik, Lizzo, The Presets, Lane 8, AJR, Tribal Seeds, Ravyn Lenae, Superorganism, Party Favor, Two Feet, HINDS, Denzel Curry, Sir Sly, Sam Feldt, Welshy Arms, Elohim, Elderbrook, FLETCHER, Yungblud, Mt. Joy, Amy Shark, Chet Porter, Mikky Ekko, Knox Fortune, Morgan Saint, Wallows, Graves, Brasstracks, Neil Frances, O Wildly, Lovely The Band, Harry Hudson, Young Bombs, The Dirty Hooks, Mike Xavier

2019

2021

Culinary line-ups 
The Culinary lineup has recently become an add-on that is attractive to attendees, organized by culinary director Lee Flint, with the intention of “working with the local talent and making it more accessible to restaurants that may not have been able to participate in the past”. The 2018 culinary lineup included Justin Kingsley Hall of the Kitchen at Atomic, Brian Howard of Sparrow + Wolf, Harvest's Royd Ellamar, Hemant Kishore from the Toddy Shop and Good Pie's Vincent Rotolo.

Art line-up

Learning line-up

References

External links
 

Music festivals in Nevada
Electronic music festivals in the United States
Rock festivals in the United States
American music
Music festivals established in 2013
2022 mergers and acquisitions